The 2006 North American Under 21 World Qualifier, a speedway event held each year to qualify for a spot in the qualifying round of the Individual Speedway Junior World Championship, was held on December 16, 2006, at the City of Industry in California. The event was won by Neil Facchini who thus became US Under-21 National Champion, but he was too old to compete in the world championship of 2007, so it was the second placed rider Dale Facchini who entered for that event. 

Notes
 

2006
North American Under 21 World Qualifier
North American Under 21 World Qualifier
Speed